Vagn Birkeland (15 March 1926 – 2022) was a Danish footballer. He played in five matches for the Denmark national football team from 1954 to 1955.

References

External links
 

1926 births
2022 deaths
People from Sønderborg
Danish men's footballers
Denmark international footballers
Kjøbenhavns Boldklub players
Association football forwards
Sportspeople from the Region of Southern Denmark